Time Line is an album by American Christian rock musician Kerry Livgren, released in 1984. It features his newly formed band, AD.

Background 

After Kerry left his previous band, Kansas, in 1983, he and his newly formed crew began production for Livgren's second solo album. Time Line was made for CBS Records and was recorded with material created by the crew. While recording, Kerry and his new crew all shared the same interest in Christianity and all the members had come together to form AD by the end of the session. Due to a complication in the label release, Time Line was unable to receive much attention compared to some of Livgren's past works with Kansas.

Reception 

AllMusic gave the album one and a half stars out of five. The album was said to be "blatantly stale" throughout its duration, lacking the creativity that Seeds of Change provided.

Track listing 

All tracks written by Kerry Livgren except where noted

 "Time Line" – 4:04
 "Tonight" – 4:53
 "Make or Break It" (Gleason) – 3:49
 "Take Us to the Water" – 4:28
 "Beyond the Pale" (Gleason, Livgren) – 3:33
 "New Age Blues" (Gleason, Livgren) – 3:54
 "Slow Motion Suicide" – 4:46
 "High on a Hill" – 3:52
 "Life Undercover" – 3:27
 "Welcome to the War" – 5:11
 "Interview with Kerry Livgren" – 24:08 (bonus track, only featured on 1996 reissue)

Personnel 
A.D.
 Michael Gleason – lead and backing vocals, keyboards, percussion 
 Kerry Livgren – keyboards, guitars, bass, DMX programming
 Dave Hope – bass guitar
 Dennis Holt – drums (1-5, 7, 9, 10), percussion
 Warren Ham – lead and backing vocals, woodwinds, harmonica

Additional musicians
 David Pack – guitar licks (6)
 Scott Meeder – drums (6)
 Craig Harber – drums (8)
 John Elefante – percussion (1), backing vocals (1)
 Terry Brock – backing vocals (2, 8)
 Kyle Henderson – backing vocals (6)

Production
 Budd Carr – executive producer 
 Mark Ferjulian – executive producer, design concept, management 
 Ken Marcellino – executive producer, art direction, design concept, management 
 Kerry Livgren – producer, engineer, design concept 
 Michael Gleason – assistant producer (10), assistant engineer (10)
 Davey Moire – assistant producer (10), assistant engineer (10)
 Glenn Meadows – mastering at Georgetown Masters (Nashville, Tennessee)
 Frank Tozour – Sony release editing
 Rick Griffin – front cover illustration, logo design, design concept
 Mark Tucker – back cover photography

References 

1984 debut albums
Kerry Livgren albums